Fair & Lovely or Fair and Lovely may refer to:

 Fair & Lovely (film), a 2014 Indian Kannada romance drama film
 Glow & Lovely, a skin-lightening cosmetic product of Hindustan Unilever, formerly known as "Fair & Lovely"